A. mitchelli may refer to:

 Abronia mitchelli, an arboreal alligator lizard species
 Amphisbaena mitchelli, a worm lizard species
 Andriasa mitchelli, Hayes, 1973, a moth species
 Anopsicus mitchelli, Gertsch, 1971, a spider species found in Mexico

See also
 Mitchelli (disambiguation)